Khubyar (also Romanized as Khūbyār; also known as Kuabarin and Kūbarīn) is a village in Charuymaq-e Markazi Rural District, in the Central District of Charuymaq County, East Azerbaijan Province, Iran. At the 2006 census, its population was 24, in 4 families.

References 

Populated places in Charuymaq County